Daniel Seltzer (13 February 1933 — 2 March 1980) was a professor of English at Princeton University, an actor and a Shakespearean scholar. He was nominated for a Tony Award for Best Performance by a Featured Actor in a Play in 1976 for his performance in Jules Feiffer's Knock Knock and had a role in director Paul Mazursky's 1978 film An Unmarried Woman starring Jill Clayburgh.

Seltzer graduated from Princeton in 1954, received his PhD from Harvard University in 1957, and taught at Harvard from 1959 to 1971.  He taught at Princeton from 1971 until his death, and was chairman of Princeton's McCarter Theatre from 1972 to 1976. He edited Robert Greene's Friar Bacon and Friar Bungay for the Regents Renaissance Drama Series (1963), Shakespeare's Troilus and Cressida for The New American Library (1963)  and The Modern Theater: Readings and Documents for Little Brown (1967).

References

External links

1933 births
1980 deaths
People from Passaic County, New Jersey
Princeton University alumni
Harvard University alumni
Harvard University faculty
Princeton University faculty
American male stage actors
American male film actors
American academics of English literature
20th-century American male actors
20th-century American non-fiction writers